Pedralva is a Portuguese parish, located in the municipality of Braga. The population in 2011 was 1,110, in an area of 8.07 km².

References

Freguesias of Braga